Tagliaferro (literally "iron cutter") is an Italian occupational surname which is most prevalent in the regions of Veneto, Piedmont and Lombardy and is also to be found among the Argentinian, Brazilian, Venezuelan and (predominantly in its spelling variant Taliaferro) the American Italian diaspora. The name is related to the French name Taillefer with similar derivation.

Notable people with the surname include:
 Al Taliaferro (originally Tagliaferro) (1905-1969), American comics artist
 Frane Tagliaferro (20th century), Croat footballer of Italian descent
 Magda Tagliaferro (1893–1986), Brazilian pianist
 Marta Tagliaferro (born 1989), Italian track and road racing cyclist
 Ramiro Tagliaferro (born 1971), Argentinian politician and political scientist

Fictional character 
 Roy Tagliaferro, alias of Red John, a fictional serial killer

References

Italian-language surnames
Occupational surnames